An opera house is a theatre building used primarily for opera performances.

As a specific venue, Opera House may refer to:
Central City Opera House in Colorado, United States
Manchester Opera House, in Manchester, England
John F. Kennedy Center for the Performing Arts's Opera House
Opera House, Royal Tunbridge Wells, a former opera house in England
Opera House, Wellington, in New Zealand
Opera House at Boothbay Harbor, in Maine, United States
Royal Opera House (Mumbai), in India
Sydney Opera House, New South Wales, Australia
The Opera House (nightclub), a former name of O2 Academy Bournemouth in Dorset, England
The Opera House (Toronto), in Canada

Opera House may also refer to:
Opera House (film), a 1961 Indian film by P. L. Santoshi 
Operahouse, a five-piece rock band based in the UK
Opera House (horse), a British Thoroughbred racehorse
Opera House Theatre, Blackpool, in Blackpool, England
"The Opera House" (song), a 1987 song by Arthur Baker, under the alias Jack E Makossa